The Renaissance Club is a golf club in Scotland, located in North Berwick,  east of Edinburgh. It hosted the 2017 Scottish Senior Open, 2019–2022 Scottish Opens, and Ladies Scottish Open in 2019 and 2020.

Scorecard

Scottish Opens
Scorecard : 

Source:

In the Scottish Open in 2019, hole 7―15 were used in front nine holes, and hole 1―6, 16―18 were used in back nine holes. In the Ladies Scottish Open, in 2019, hole 7―15 were used in front nine holes, and holes 1―6, 16―18 were used in back nine holes, while in 2020, holes 1―6, 16, 14, 15 were used in front nine holes, and hole 7―13, 17, 18 wre used on the back nine.

References

External links

Golf clubs and courses in East Lothian
North Berwick
Sports clubs established in 2008
2008 establishments in Scotland